The 1986 WCT World Doubles was a tennis tournament played on indoor carpet courts at Royal Albert Hall in London, Great Britain that was part of the 1986 Nabisco Grand Prix. It was the tour finals for the doubles season of the WCT Tour section. The tournament was held from January 6 through January 12, 1986.

Champions

Doubles

 Heinz Günthardt /  Balázs Taróczy defeated  Paul Annacone /  Christo van Rensburg 6–4, 1–6, 7–6, 6–7, 6–4

References

World Championship Tennis World Doubles
WCT World Doubles